Salo Wittmayer Baron (May 26, 1895 – November 25, 1989) was an Austrian-born American historian, described as "the greatest Jewish historian of the 20th century". Baron taught at Columbia University from 1930 until his retirement in 1963.

Life

Baron was born in Tarnów, Galicia, which was then part of the Austro-Hungarian Empire but is now in Poland. Baron's family was educated and affluent, part of the Jewish aristocracy of Galicia. His father was a banker and president of the Jewish community of 16,000. Baron's first language was Polish, but he knew twenty languages, including Yiddish, Biblical and modern Hebrew, French and German, and was famous for being able to give scholarly lectures  without notes - in five languages. Baron received rabbinical ordination at the Jewish Theological Seminary in Vienna in 1920, and earned three doctorates from the University of Vienna, in philosophy in 1917, in political science in 1922 and in law in 1923. He began his teaching career at the Jewish Teachers College (Juedisches Paedagogium) in Vienna in 1926, but was persuaded to move to New York to teach at the Jewish Institute of Religion by Rabbi Stephen S. Wise in New York.

Baron's appointment as the Nathan L. Miller Professor of Jewish History, Literature and Institutions at Columbia University in 1929 is considered to mark the beginning of the teaching of the academic field of Jewish Studies in an American university.

In 1933, Jeannette Meisel, a graduate student in economics, consulted him about a dissertation she was writing. They married in 1934, and Jeannette Baron became a collaborator in his scholarly work. "He and his wife, in their heyday, were a kind of partnership," Mr. Hertzberg recalled. "She helped with every one of his books, and they signed a couple of monographs together."

After World War Two, Baron ran the Jewish Cultural Reconstruction, Inc., an organization established in 1947 to collect and distribute heirless Jewish property in the American occupied zones of Europe.  Hundreds of thousands of books, archives, and ceremonial objects were distributed to libraries and museums, primarily in Israel and the United States.

On April 24, 1961, Professor Baron testified at the trial of Adolf Eichmann in Jerusalem. Baron explained the historical context of the Nazi genocide against the Jews. He further explained that in his birthplace, Tarnow, there had been 20,000 Jews before the war but, after Hitler, there were no more than 20. His parents and a sister were killed there.

In addition to his scholarly work, Baron was active in organizational efforts to maintain and strengthen the Jewish community both before and after World War II. From 1950 to 1968, he directed the Center of Israel and Jewish Studies at Columbia University. He received more than a dozen honorary degrees from universities in the United States, Europe and Israel  and was elected a Fellow of the American Academy of Arts and Sciences in 1964.

He died in New York City aged 94. The Salo Wittmayer Baron Chair of Jewish History, Culture and Society at Columbia University was created in his honor.

Scholarship
According to Yosef Hayim Yerushalmi, Baron "was undoubtedly the greatest Jewish historian of the 20th century." His and his wife's magnum opus was A Social and Religious History of the Jews (Columbia University Press), which began as a series of lectures, turned into a three-volume overview of Jewish history published in 1937 and finally grew into a revised version. Professor Baron continued to work on the series throughout his life.

Baron opposed the "lachrymose conception of Jewish history," sometimes identified with Heinrich Graetz, a great 19th-century Jewish historian who found the main elements of Jewish experience through the ages to be suffering and spiritual scholarship. In a 1975 interview, Baron said "Suffering is part of the destiny [of the Jews], but so is repeated joy as well as ultimate redemption."

Professor Baron also strove to integrate the religious dimension of Jewish history into a full picture of Jewish life and to integrate the history of Jews into the wider history of the eras and societies in which they lived.

Literary works
 The Jewish Community (3 vols., 1942)
 Jews of the United States, 1790–1840: A Documentary History (ed. with Joseph L. Blau, 3 vols., 1963)
 A Social and Religious History of the Jews (18 vols., 2d ed. 1952–1983)

See also
Jewish studies
American Jewish Historical Society

References

Further reading
 
 Liberles, Robert. Salo Wittmayer Baron: Architect of Jewish history, 	(New York University Press, 1995)

External links
 Entry on BARON, SALO (Shalom) WITTMAYER by Arthur Hertzberg in the Encyclopaedia Judaica (2nd ed., 2007)
 http://c250.columbia.edu/c250_celebrates/remarkable_columbians/salo_wittmayer_baron.html
 https://web.archive.org/web/20070322013246/http://www.bartleby.com/65/ba/Baron-Sa.html
 http://www.encyclopedia.com/html/B/Baron-Sa.asp
 http://www.bookrags.com/biography-salo-wittmayer-baron/index.html
 Salo W. Baron Papers, 1900-1980, 1982-2000 (400 linear ft.) are housed in the Department of Special Collections and University Archives at Stanford University Libraries

1895 births
1989 deaths
Austrian emigrants to the United States
American Conservative rabbis
20th-century American rabbis
American people of Polish-Jewish descent
American Jews
20th-century American historians
Jewish American historians
American Jewish theologians
Columbia University faculty
Fellows of the American Academy of Arts and Sciences
Historians of Jews and Judaism
American male non-fiction writers
Austro-Hungarian Jews
Jews from Galicia (Eastern Europe)
People from Tarnów
University of Vienna alumni
20th-century American male writers